Vuckovich is a surname, a transcription of the surname Vučković. Notable people with the surname include:

Gene Vuckovich (born 1936), American politician
Pete Vuckovich (born 1952), American baseball player

Croatian surnames
Serbian surnames